The 1982 LFF Lyga was the 61st season of the LFF Lyga football competition in Lithuania.  It was contested by 16 teams, and Pazanga Vilnius won the championship.

League standings

References
RSSSF

LFF Lyga seasons
football
Lith